Albert Martin Sacks (August 15, 1920 – March 22, 1991) was an American lawyer and former Dean of Harvard Law School.

Born in New York City to Jewish immigrants from Russia, he attended City College of New York graduating in 1940. After serving in World War II, he attended Harvard Law School, where he was president of the Harvard Law Review, and graduated in 1948.

He then served as a law clerk for judge Augustus N. Hand of the United States Court of Appeals for the Second Circuit and from 1949 to 1950 for Justice Felix Frankfurter of the Supreme Court of the United States. After working as an associate at Covington & Burling in Washington for two years, he joined the faculty of Harvard Law School in 1952 and served for 39 years. He succeeded Derek Bok as Dean of Harvard Law School in 1971.

Sacks died at Massachusetts General Hospital in 1991.

See also 
 List of law clerks of the Supreme Court of the United States (Seat 2)

References 

1920 births
1991 deaths
American people of Russian-Jewish descent
Lawyers from New York City
Jewish American attorneys
City College of New York alumni
Harvard Law School alumni
Deans of Harvard Law School
Law clerks of the Supreme Court of the United States
20th-century American lawyers
20th-century American Jews
20th-century American academics